A red herring is something that misleads or distracts from a relevant or important question. It may be either a logical fallacy or a literary device that leads readers or audiences toward a false conclusion. A red herring may be used intentionally, as in mystery fiction or as part of rhetorical strategies (e.g., in politics), or may be used in argumentation inadvertently.

The term was popularized in 1807 by English polemicist William Cobbett, who told a story of having used a strong-smelling smoked fish to divert and distract hounds from chasing a rabbit.

Logical fallacy 
As an informal fallacy, the red herring falls into a broad class of relevance fallacies. Unlike the straw man, which involves a distortion of the other party's position, the red herring is a seemingly plausible, though ultimately irrelevant, diversionary tactic. According to the Oxford English Dictionary, a red herring may be intentional or unintentional; it is not necessarily a conscious intent to mislead.

The expression is mainly used to assert that an argument is not relevant to the issue being discussed. For example, "I think we should make the academic requirements stricter for students. I recommend you support this because we are in a budget crisis, and we do not want our salaries affected." The second sentence, though used to support the first sentence, does not address that topic.

Intentional device 
In fiction and non-fiction a red herring may be intentionally used by the writer to plant a false clue that leads readers or audiences toward a false conclusion. For example, the character of Bishop Aringarosa in Dan Brown's The Da Vinci Code is presented for most of the novel as if he is at the centre of the church's conspiracies, but is later revealed to have been innocently duped by the true antagonist of the story. The character's name is a loose Italian translation of "red herring" (aringa rosa; rosa actually meaning pink, and very close to rossa, red).

A red herring is found in the first Sherlock Holmes story, A Study in Scarlet, where the murderer writes at the crime scene the word "Rache" ("revenge" in German), leading the and the to mistakenly presume that a German was involved.

A red herring is often used in legal studies and exam problems to mislead and distract students from reaching a correct conclusion about a legal issue, intended as a device that tests students' comprehension of underlying law and their ability to properly discern material factual circumstances.

History 

There is no fish species called "red herring", rather it is a name given to a particularly strong kipper, made from fish (typically herring) strongly cured in brine or heavily smoked. This process makes the fish particularly pungent smelling and, with strong enough brine, turns its flesh reddish. In this literal sense, as a strongly cured kipper, the term can be dated to the mid-13th century, in the poem The Treatise by Walter of Bibbesworth: "He eteþ no ffyssh But heryng red."

Until 2008, the figurative sense of "red herring" was thought to originate from a supposed technique of training young scent hounds. There are variations of the story, but according to one version, the pungent red herring would be dragged along a trail until a puppy learned to follow the scent. Later, when the dog was being trained to follow the faint odour of a fox or a badger, the trainer would drag a red herring (whose strong scent confuses the animal) perpendicular to the animal's trail to confuse the dog. The dog eventually learned to follow the original scent rather than the stronger scent. A variation of this story is given, without mention of its use in training, in The Macmillan Book of Proverbs, Maxims, and Famous Phrases (1976), with the earliest use cited being from W. F. Butler's Life of Napier, published in 1849. Brewer's Dictionary of Phrase and Fable (1981) gives the full phrase as "Drawing a red herring across the path", an idiom meaning "to divert attention from the main question by some side issue"; here, once again, a "dried, smoked and salted" herring when "drawn across a fox's path destroys the scent and sets the hounds at fault." Another variation of the dog story is given by Robert Hendrickson (1994) who says escaping convicts used the pungent fish to throw off hounds in pursuit.

According to a pair of articles by Professor Gerald Cohen and Robert Scott Ross published in Comments on Etymology (2008), supported by etymologist Michael Quinion and accepted by the Oxford English Dictionary, the idiom did not originate from a hunting practice. Ross researched the origin of the story and found the earliest reference to using herrings for training animals was in a tract on horsemanship published in 1697 by Gerland Langbaine. Langbaine recommended a method of training horses (not hounds) by dragging the carcass of a cat or fox so that the horse would be accustomed to following the chaos of a hunting party. He says if a dead animal is not available, a red herring would do as a substitute. This recommendation was misunderstood by Nicholas Cox, published in the notes of another book around the same time, who said it should be used to train hounds (not horses). Either way, the herring was not used to distract the hounds or horses from a trail, rather to guide them along it.

The earliest reference to using herring for distracting hounds is an article published on 14 February 1807 by radical journalist William Cobbett in his polemical periodical Political Register. According to Cohen and Ross, and accepted by the OED, this is the origin of the figurative meaning of red herring. In the piece, William Cobbett critiques the English press, which had mistakenly reported Napoleon's defeat. Cobbett recounted that he had once used a red herring to deflect hounds in pursuit of a hare, adding "It was a mere transitory effect of the political red-herring; for, on the Saturday, the scent became as cold as a stone." Quinion concludes: "This story, and [Cobbett's] extended repetition of it in 1833, was enough to get the figurative sense of red herring into the minds of his readers, unfortunately also with the false idea that it came from some real practice of huntsmen."

Although Cobbett popularized the figurative usage, he was not the first to consider red herring for scenting hounds in a literal sense; an earlier reference occurs in the pamphlet Nashe's Lenten Stuffe, published in 1599 by the Elizabethan writer Thomas Nashe, in which he says "Next, to draw on hounds to a scent, to a red herring skin there is nothing comparable." The Oxford English Dictionary makes no connection with Nashe's quote and the figurative meaning of red herring to distract from the intended target, only in the literal sense of a hunting practice to draw dogs toward a scent.

The use of herring to distract pursuing scent hounds was tested on Episode 148 of the series MythBusters.  Although the hound used in the test stopped to eat the fish and lost the fugitive's scent temporarily, it eventually backtracked and located the target, resulting in the myth being classified by the show as "Busted".

See also 

 Chekhov's gun
 Chewbacca defense
 Dead cat strategy
 Decoy
 False flag
 False positive
 False scent
 Foreshadowing
 Garden path sentence
 Ignoratio elenchi
 Judgmental language
 
 MacGuffin
 Non sequitur (fallacy)
 Plot twist
 Red herring prospectus
 Shaggy dog story
 Snipe hunt (a fool's errand or wild goose chase)
 The Five Red Herrings
 Twelve Red Herrings

References

External links
 

Narrative techniques
Plot (narrative)
Relevance fallacies
Informal fallacies
Figures of speech
Metaphors referring to fish
English-language idioms
Decoys
Deception